Teppo Salmisaari (19 June 1924, Tampere - 9 July 2006) was a Finnish sprint canoeist who competed in the early 1950s. He finished ninth in the C-2 10000 m event at the 1952 Summer Olympics in Helsinki.

References
Sports-reference.com profile

1924 births
2006 deaths
Canoeists from Tampere
Canoeists at the 1952 Summer Olympics
Finnish male canoeists
Olympic canoeists of Finland